Cardross (Scottish Gaelic: Càrdainn Ros) is a large village with a population of 2,194 (2011) in Scotland, on the north side of the Firth of Clyde, situated halfway between Dumbarton and Helensburgh. Cardross is in the historic geographical county of Dunbartonshire but the modern political local authority of Argyll and Bute.

Cardross Village took its name from the historic parish in which it is located and where King Robert the Bruce lived the final years of his life. The Parish of Cardross stretched in area from the River Leven on the west side of Dumbarton to Camus Eskan (near Helensburgh), and stretched as far north to include the village of Renton in the Vale of Leven.

The distinction between Cardross village and Cardross Parish is particularly important for students of Scottish history. King Robert the Bruce's documented association with ’Cardross’ occurred three centuries prior to the existence of the modern-day village, and at a time when the name referred to the ecclesiastical parish and its church, Cardross Kirk.

The original piece of land known as ’Cardross’ is at the eastern edge of the historic parish and the western point of the confluence of the River Clyde and River Leven at the town of Dumbarton, facing across to Dumbarton Rock and Castle. Today the land is known as “sand point” and sits on the edge of Dumbarton's Levengrove Park. The site of medieval Cardross Kirk, and its remains, sits within Levengrove Park.

Etymology
Cardross is a name of Brittonic origin. The first part of the name is the Brittonic or Pictish *carden, generally meaning "a wild place, a thicket" (Middle Welsh cardden). The second is the element -rōs, "moor, promontory" (Welsh rhos). In other words, a thicketed promontory of land.

History
The settlement of Cardross developed around a 17th-century church.

Modern-day ‘Ferry Road’ runs the short distance between the A814 and the River Clyde at the easternmost extremity of Cardross Village (closest to Dumbarton).

The new settlement eventually took its name from the church, and the parish that it served, as the 17th-century worshippers headed for the re-located ‘Cardross’ every Sunday.

Today no remains of that original Cardross Village church can be found but the Graveyard is still in use and contains several 17th-century gravestones.

Robert the Bruce purchased the portions of lands of Pillanflatt from the Earl of Lennox, lying on the western bank of the River Leven, Dunbartonshire, in the Parish of Cardross, in 1326. In 1329, he died at the manorial house that he built there.

A field on the bank of River Leven south of the village of Renton, West Dunbartonshire, called the Mains of Cardross, is thought to have been the location of his royal manor, none of which remains today. In 2017, Dumbarton Football Club's proposed new stadium was refused planning permission, with one of the objections being its likely placement on the medieval Bruce site.

Natural history
 north-west of Cardross is a peninsula called Ardmore Point. This privately owned area of land has a nature trail and is considered a Regionally Important Geographical Site (RIGS) due to unique rock formations including an exposed sea cliff. It is a popular fishing and bird-spotting area inhabited by grey seals.

Facilities

Commercial
There are a number of businesses, including a sawmill, car mechanic, a Co-operative Food Store, newsagents, pharmacy, post office, plumber's merchant, an Indian style take-away, a couple of hairdressers, soap shop and a jewellers.

Ardardan Estate is a working farm with a farm shop, plant nursery and tea room and is situated outside Cardross near Ardmore Point, but closer to the town of Helensburgh.

Sports
The town possesses a golf course, bowling, tennis and football clubs. Paul Lawrie won the Scottish Professional Golf Championship which was held at Cardross Golf Course in 1992.

Education
Cardross has its own pre-school and primary school.

Transport
Cardross railway station has direct links to both  and  stations on the North Clyde Line; the station is operated by ScotRail.

A bus service is provided by First Glasgow.

Tourist attractions
Cardross is the site of one of the most important modernist buildings in the world.  St Peters seminary. Built in the early 1960's.

Geilston Garden, a National Trust for Scotland property, is located on the north west edge of the village.

There is also a ruined church, which was bombed in May 1942 during World War 2. The reason for Cardross being targeted by German bombers remains unclear, locals have speculated buildings in the village might have been mistaken as a shipyard or an oil storage facility.

Religion
The village has two places of worship: Cardross Parish Church (Church of Scotland) and a Roman Catholic Church dedicated to Saint Mahew. The original parish church was bombed during the Second World War and its ruins are located next to the former Church of Scotland manse.

Listed buildings/structures
There are nearly fifty listed buildings/structures in Cardross, two of which are category A.

Some structures of note:

 The 14th century St. Mahew's Chapel. Most recently restored in the 1950s as a Catholic church which remains in use.
 The former St. Peter's Seminary, designed by Gillespie, Kidd & Coia, is situated to the north of the village; it is closed to the public. Abandoned in the late 1980s, it is in a state of dilapidation, particularly internally.  In early 2015 the site was handed over to the NVA with the intention that part of it will become an arts venue, however those plans failed due to a lack of funding.
 The ruined 15th-century Kilmahew Castle that was built by the Napier Clan is situated just north of the village.
 The main road through the village goes over Moore's Bridge (1688) which carries the road over Kilmahew Burn.

Notable residents
A. J. Cronin, the celebrated doctor and writer, was born in Cardross in 1896.
The BBC sports presenter Hazel Irvine lived in Cardross during her youth.

References

Notes

Sources

External links
Video footage of Cardross railway station

Villages in Argyll and Bute